The Matrix 01 (橙仕 01) is an electric 4-door microvan designed and produced by the Chinese automaker Matrix Motors from 2020.

Overview

The Matrix 01 is a fully electric urban logistics microvan by Chengshi, specially designed for the needs of urban logistics and distribution. Three variants of the vehicle are available, with the Matrix 01 being the microvan variant from 2020 and the Matrix X2 being offered as a 2-door single cab pickup and a 3-door crew cab pickup variant from 2022.

Specifications
The Matrix 01 is powered by a singe electric motor developing 20 hp and 90 Nm. Two battery options are available, with a 10.36 kWh ternary lithium Battery for 120 kilometers of range and a 20.72 kWh ternary lithium Battery for 220 kilometers of range. Prices starts from 46,665 RMB. 

The Matrix X2 pickup launched in 2022 shares the same powertrain while the electric motor developing 20 hp has the torque tuned up to 105 Nm. Battery options are also shared with the Matrix 01 with a 10.36 kWh battery for 110 kilometers of range and the 20.72 kWh battery for 200 kilometers of range. The Matrix X2 has a body-on-frame chassis and is rear-wheel drive. Prices for the Matrix X2 ranges from 46,600 RMB to 59,800 RMB ($7,365 to 9,452).

References

External links
Official website

Farizon Xingxiang V
Vans
Electric vans
Cars introduced in 2022
2020s cars
Rear-wheel-drive vehicles